Paris Métro Line 15 is one of four new lines of Grand Paris Express, a major expansion project of the Paris Métro. Currently under construction, the line will provide a new orbital route through the suburbs of Paris, servicing the departments of Hauts-de-Seine, Val-de-Marne and Seine-Saint-Denis. The southern section of the line is planned to open in 2025, with the completed line planned to open in the early 2030s. Line 15 will be fully automated (along with all Grand Paris Express lines) and when completed, will be the longest underground rapid tunnel for passenger traffic in the world.

The line is being built by Société du Grand Paris, a public agency set up by the French Government to deliver the Grand Paris Express project.

History 
The route of line 15 is very similar to that of the Arc Express, initially proposed by the RATP in 2006. It was later included in the red line project of the Grand Paris public transportation network, introduced by French President Nicolas Sarkozy in 2009. In March 2013, the "New Grand Paris" project was announced by the Prime Minister at the time, Jean-Marc Ayrault. At this time, the line acquired its current line 15 naming.

Proposed timeline 
In 2013, the government led by Ayrault proposed the following implementation timeline for the line 15 project:
 During 2014: Public inquiry on the eastern section from Saint-Denis Pleyel to Champigny Centre.
 Early 2015: Groundbreaking of the southern section spanning Pont-de-Sèvres to Noisy–Champs.
 During 2020: Groundbreaking of the segments from Pont-de-Sèvres to Nanterre and from Saint-Denis Pleyel to Rosny-Bois-Perrier of the northern section.
 2024: Southern section from Pont de Sèvres to Noisy-Champs put into service. This was subsequently delayed to 2025.
 2030: western section from Pont de Sèvres to Saint-Denis Pleyel and eastern section from Saint-Denis Pleyel to Champigny Centre put into service.

Construction 
The project will be constructed in two phases, with the southern section (Pont de Sèvres to Noisy-Champs) opening first in 2025, and the east and west sections opening in 2030.

Line 15 South 

The southern section of the line, between Pont de Sèvres and Noisy–Champs is 33 km in length, with 16 stations and 2 maintenance depots. This section of the line is estimated to cost around €3.7bn.

The first public inquiry, focused on the southern section from Pont-de-Sèvres to Noisy-Champs, was held from October to mid-November 2013. Following declaration of public utility in December 2014, preparatory construction work began in March 2015. The first major construction contracts were awarded in March 2016, with major civil engineering beginning in June 2016. Tunnelling was completed on the south section of the line between Pont de Sèvres and Noisy–Champs in April 2021. 

The planned opening date of the southern section several times. Initially, the opening of the southern section was planned for 2018, which was then delayed to 2022 and then to 2024. In September 2018, the opening of the southern section of the line was delayed to the first half of 2025, missing the 2024 Olympic and Paralympic Games. , the southern section of Line 15 is planned to open at the end of 2025.

Line 15 East and West 
The northern section of the line, divided into east and west segments - will extend Line 15 from Pont de Sèvres to Champigny Centre, via La Défense and Saint-Denis Pleyel - completing the orbital route of the line. 16 stations will be built, as well as a maintenance depot. The eastern section was originally estimated to cost €3.77bn, however this was revised to €5.65bn in 2021.

The declaration of public utility was in November 2016 for the western section, and in February 2017 for the eastern section. Although major construction contracts for the line itself have not been awarded, the construction of the station Saint-Denis Pleyel is underway, which will provide interchanges with Line 16 and Line 17. The station will serve the 2024 Olympic and Paralympic Games.

, the east and west sections of Line 15 are planned to open in 2030.

System map

Rolling stock 
In July 2018, Alstom was selected to supply the rolling stock for the Grand Paris Express project at a cost of €1.3bn for 183 trains. The initial tranche of 150 cars (25 trains of 6 car length) would be delivered to Line 15 from 2022.

The specifications of the trains travelling line 15 and their operation are as follows:
 Train width:  minimum
 Train length: , made up of 6 cars with full-open interior gangways
 Train capacity: 960 passengers (at 4 passengers per m²)
 Rails: iron
 Electric traction current: 1500 volt direct current via pantograph and contact wires
 Operation: Fully automated
 Operating speed: 
 Average speed (including stops): 
 Theoretical morning rush hour throughput: 34 560 passengers per hour
 Average interval: 3 to 4 minutes
 Minimum interval: 2 minutes

References

Transport in Paris
2025 in rail transport